Whitefrozen is the 2003 debut EP by the Norwegian unblack and Viking metal band Vardøger. Vardøger formed in 1994, under the name Hidden Paradise, as a side project of its constituent musicians.

Recording and release 
Songs were recorded in 1995 through 1997, including a 24-minute track that has never been released, but due to the band members' other commitments, Vardøger did not manage to release any music at that time and the group disbanded. However, "Footprints of Thunder" was subsequently released on the compilation album In the Shadow of Death: A Scandinavian Extreme Music Compilation in 2000. The band reformed in order to release more music, resulting in an EP in 2003 through Endtime Productions.

Style 
On this release, the style performed by Vardøger was described as black metal mixed with folk music, black and folk metal, and Viking metal. The song "Footprints of Thunder" was described as symphonic black metal. Johannes Jonsson described the songs on the EP as "slow black metal" and "slow majestic Viking Metal." Stefan Lang compared the sound of the titular song "Whitefrozen" to the output of Amorphis. Overall, he found the sound of the band to be similar to Schaliach, due to the presence of Dalbakk in both bands, except that Vardøger demonstrated a more black metal sound and was absent the contribution of Schaliach's other member, Ole Børud. Matt Morrow described Whitefrozen as the place where "driving aggression frolics in the fields with haunting melodies. Where bells, chanting, ivory, and the marching of drums are welcome friends."

Reception 
The EP was well-received, with Ultimate Guitar describing it as a "classic." Stefan Lang of Powermetal.de was favorable to the album, stating that there was no question that the band had the potential to crawl above the average. HM writer Matt Morrow gave the album a full ten-out-of-ten, expressing his delight that the band had released more material after their compilation appearance. Writer Johannes Jonsson rated the album three-out-of-five, calling the EP "a really nice cd for everyone into slow black metal." He praised the vocals of Peter Dalbakk, which he considered better in this project than in Dalbakk's other band, Schaliach. Jonsson said that he could not get into the tracks "Desert Pale" and "Inferno", but that the other three songs on the EP were excellent. In a brief and retrospective review, Jakob Plantinga of Rocklife.nl said that while Whitefrozen was not a bad record, it was not particularly innovative.

Track listing

Personnel 

 Alexander Dalbakk - Guitars
 Knut Anders Sørum - Keyboards
 Magnus Westgaard- Bass
 Stian Aarebrot - Guitars, vocals
 Robert Bordevik - Guitars, vocals
 Peter Dalbakk - Vocals
 Tom Arne Fossheim - Drums

References 

Vardøger (band) albums
2003 debut EPs
Viking metal albums
Folk metal albums
Folk rock albums by Norwegian artists 
Symphonic black metal EPs
Symphonic metal albums by Norwegian artists